, also known as Tokyo Incidents, is a Japanese rock band formed by Ringo Sheena, after leaving her solo career. The band's debut single "Gunjō Biyori" was released in September 2004, and they ended activities in February 2012. The band sold 2.3 million albums, singles, and DVDs. The band reunited and released a new single on January 1, 2020.

History

Origins (2003) 
Tokyo Jihen started as Ringo Sheena's backing band at first for her last concert tour before ending the first half of her solo career. Sheena was contemplating working with a band while working on her last solo album, Kalk Samen Kuri no Hana. She began looking for members of her backing band to support her solo tour "Sugoroku Ecstasy" in the Autumn of 2003. The tour band was introduced as Tokyo Jihen during the tour for the first time, featuring guitarist Mikio Hirama, pianist H Zett M, drummer Toshiki Hata, and familiar bassist Seiji Kameda. The musicians she selected became the core of what would become Tokyo Jihen.

After the tour, she announced that she would stop her solo career to join "Tokyo Jihen" as a full-fledged member.

"Phase 1" era and its end (2004–2005) 
On May 31, 2004, the members of the Tokyo Jihen declared that they worked as a permanent band. On July 24, they appeared in the presence of fans at the live 0724 Yamabikari for the first time. They played some live sets during that year's Fuji Rock Festival, and made their major debut with the single "Gunjō Biyori" on September 8. Tokyo Jihen released one album and two singles, and held their first concert tour -Tokyo Jihen live tour 2005 "dynamite!"-.

On July 1, 2005, it was announced during the tour that keyboardist H ZETT M and guitarist Mikio Hirama would leave Tokyo Jihen. H ZETT M returned to his duties as pianist for PE'Z, and Hirama went back to being a solo singer. It was decided that they would withdraw from the band before the "dynamite!" tour started.

After the departure of the band's former guitarist and keyboardist, Sheena began a search for new members. She was going to have at least a keyboard player join because two people left the band at the same time. H ZETT M recommended his friend and former bandmate, Keitaro Izawa, as a substitute for him to Sheena, but she began visiting music clubs to look for other keyboardists. In the end she found no one who was better than Izawa, and Sheena decided to invite him to join. He assumed the stage name of Ichiyo Izawa during his time with the band.

The search for a new guitarist proved more difficult. Sheena approached several guitarists as potential members, but was turned down by all of them, possibly because they disliked the idea of being considered her "backing band". At worst, she planned to choose a different guitarist each time without having a regular guitarist. However, when the other members listened to the first Tokyo Jihen album Kyōiku demos, the situation changed. All of them were pleased with the demo session guitarist and asked Sheena his name. This guitarist was Ryosuke Nagaoka, who assumed the stage name of Ukigumo after joining Tokyo Jihen. Sheena and Ukigumo had been friends since her days as a soloist. He turned down the offer to join Tokyo Jihen at first, but finally accepted just before recording began for Adult.

With so many members replaced, Sheena considered changing the name of the band, but decided against it in the end.

In September 2005, keyboardist Ichiyō Izawa and guitarist Ukigumo formally joined Tokyo Jihen.

Beginning of "Phase 2" (2006–2007) 
The band's second album "Adult", released on January 25, 2006, went to number one on the Oricon charts, a first for the band. They held two concerts, entitled "DOMESTIC! Virgin LINE", at Nippon Budokan Hall and Osaka-jo Hall in February as the new members debut. A nationwide tour, "DOMESTIC!" Just can't help it followed later the same year.

In the latter half of 2006, Sheena produced the film score of the movie Sakuran, on which three of the other four band members (excluding Hata, who had broken his leg) collaborated.

Following the 2007 release of two singles, "O.S.C.A." and "Killer-tune", and an album, Variety, the first release not containing any compositions by Sheena, they embarked on the concert tour "Tokyo Jihen live tour 2007 Spa & Treatment" to promote the album.

Members' activities outside Tokyo Jihen (2008–2009) 
The music video for "Killer-tune" won the Best Technical Works Video category in the March 15, 2008 Space Shower Music Video Awards 08 by Space Shower TV.

As 2008 marked the 10th anniversary of Sheena's professional debut, she resumed solo activities as "Ringo Sheena" for the first time since the formation of Tokyo Jihen. She participated in the summer Rising Sun Rock Festival both as a soloist and as a member of Tokyo Jihen. The activity of Tokyo Jihen was thus restricted during this period.

In 2009, Sheena continued her solo activity from the previous year with the release of a new solo album, her first since 2003's Kalk Samen Kuri no Hana, in June. During the same period, Ukigumo and Izawa resumed activities with their respective bands. Kameda returned to his work as a producer, overseeing several top ten releases, and Hata participated in the recording and subsequent tour for Fujifabric's new album. Sheena, Ukigumo, and Izawa were all involved in the production of Rie Tomosaka's album Toridori the same year. Ukigumo and Izawa joined Tomosaka's promotional tour as part of her backing band.

On May 25, 2009, it was announced that Izawa had joined "The Hiatus", a new band formed by former Ellegarden member Takeshi Hosomi. They defined The Hiatus as "a project of music, arts, and depicters" on the band's official site. Izawa was listed as a tour member on the site, and took part in their "Trash We'd Love Tour 2009".

On December 2, 2009, Tokyo Jihen released the single "Nōdōteki Sanpunkan", their first in two years, and resumed their activity as a band full-time. They appeared as part of the lineup of the December 30, 2009 Countdown Japan 09/10.

Final years and dissolution (2010–2012) 
The fourth album Sports, released on February 24, 2010, won the 1st place in Oricon chart after an interval of four years. The nationwide tour "Tokyo Incident live tour 2010 UltraC" started in March.

The fifth album Dai Hakken was released on June 29, 2011, and the nationwide tour "Tokyo Incident live tour 2011 Discovery" started in September 30.

On January 11, 2012, Ringo Sheena announced their break up on their official site. Their last original release, a mini-album entitled Color Bars, was released on January 18, 2012. A live best of album, Tokyo Collection, and a concert DVD and Blu-ray release of their "Discovery Tour" went on sale on February 15. Tokyo Jihen's embarked on a final tour, entitled "Domestique Bon Voyage", which included Yokohama Arena (February 14–15), Osaka-jo Hall (February 21–22), and Tokyo's Nippon Budokan (February 28–29).

The band officially dissolved on February 29, 2012, after their sold-out final Budokan concert. On June 15, an announcement on Sheena's official site, Kronekodow, revealed that Tokyo Jihen would release one final album, Shin'ya Waku  (The Edge of Late Night), and DVD/Blu-ray video, Chin Play Kou Play (Strange Plays and Great Plays) in August of that year. The album, a collection of B-sides, included the previously unreleased-on-CD "Handsome Sugite" and one new song, "Tadanaranu Kankei". The video contained highlights from the band's best live performances along with festival appearances and rare material.

After dissolution 
On December 31, 2016, when Sheena Ringo participated in the 67th NHK Kōhaku Uta Gassen, Tokyo Jihen played as her backing band. However, the band's name was not written in the credits.  Ukigumo and H Zett M have been regular collaborators with Sheena, playing on recorded work and in backing bands on her live tours.

Reunion 
On January 1, 2020, Tokyo Jihen released a surprise digital single, "Erabarezaru Kokumin", and announced a tour of Japan titled "Live Tour 2020 News Flash", beginning February 29. In February, the band announced their 5-song EP News would be released on April 8, 2020. Their sixth studio album Ongaku (Music) was released on June 9, 2021.

Members

Phase 2 members 

 Active: 2003–2012 2019–present
 Instruments: Lead vocals, Electric guitar, Acoustic guitar, Piano, Electronic keyboards, Melodica, Kazoo
 Real name: 
Sheena is an acclaimed singer-songwriter who has enjoyed enormous popularity since her debut at the age of 18.
She is the founder and the leader of the group, and initially wrote almost all their songs, but later shared songwriting duties with the other band members.

 Active: 2003–2012 2019–present
 Instruments: Bass guitar, Upright bass, Electric upright bass
Kameda is a music producer and music arranger for many Japanese musicians.
Kameda is also a famous session bassist. He participates in many musicians' recording, or plays a bass as a member of various solo singers' backing band. He is a bassist of Bank Band since 2005.
Kameda knew Ringo Sheena before her debut, and he has supported her since then. Ringo Sheena calls him "Shisho", meaning master or teacher. He rose to fame along with her and became a famous producer, but he concentrates on playing a bass guitar in Tokyo Jihen.
Musicians he has produced include Angela Aki, Yui Aragaki, Ayaka, Chara, Chatmonchy, Do As Infinity, Elephant Kashimashi, Flow, Fujifabric, Ayaka Hirahara, Ken Hirai, Ikimono-gakari, Juju, Nico Touches the Walls, Plastic Tree, Shota Shimizu, Spitz, Shikao Suga, Hiroshi Takano, The Boom, Λucifer, and Wise.

 Active: 2003–2012 2019–present
 Instruments: Drums, Percussion
 Real name: 
Hata had drummed as session musician and tour musician for various artists, including Mika Nakashima (2002, 2004, 2005), Dreams Come True (2008 in recording), and Fujifabric (2009).
Hata frequently plays as a support member of his former band Scoop, as well as forming the band  with Hideaki Yamazaki, another ex-Scoop member and current bassist for School Food Punishment.

 Active: 2005–2012 2019–present
 Instruments: Electric guitar, Acoustic guitar, Backing vocals, Rapping
 Real name: 
Ukigumo is an old friend of Sheena's. He has also played music with Junpei Shiina before, as well as Hata and Tabu Zombie of Soil & "Pimp" Sessions; he also played on Sheena's fourth solo album, Sanmon Gossip. He gave Sheena advice when the former members of Tokyo Jihen left the band.
He has his own band, .

 Active: 2005–2012 2019–present
 Instruments: Piano, Electronic keyboards, Electric guitar, Background Vocals
 Real name: 
Izawa and former Tokyo Jihen pianist HZM are alumni of the Kunitachi College of Music, and have been in a band together before.
He has his own band, and has more recently played with the band The Hiatus as a tour member.

Phase 1 members

 Active: 2003–2005
 Instruments: Piano, Electronic keyboards, Background Vocals
 Real name: 
HZM is a core member of the Japanese instrumental jazz band PE'Z, which made their major debut before the formation of Tokyo Jihen.
After the release of Tokyo Jihen's first album, he decided to leave to devote himself to PE'Z full-time.

 Active: 2003–2005
 Instruments: Guitars, Background Vocals
 Real name: 
 Nickname: Micky
Hirama had released two mini-albums on indie labels as a solo musician, and was also in the band "peppermints kiss cafe" as a guitarist at the time he joined Tokyo Jihen.
Sheena had met him before at an audition, and subsequently searched for him in hopes of adding him to the band.
After the release of Tokyo Jihen's first album, he decided to return to his career as a solo musician.

Timeline

Producers 

 Main occupation: Audio engineer
Inoue has produced all of Sheena Ringo's works since her second album. Sheena calls him "the sixth member".

Naming of members
The real names of Hirama and Hata are "平間 幹央" and "畑 利樹" respectively, but, Ringo Sheena gave them stage names, using Kanji which is not usually used for their names, but as they are the phonetic equivalent, the pronunciation is not changed.
Since Ryosuke Nagaoka always drifted unsteadily and nobody knew where he would go, Sheena named Nagaoka "Ukigumo" which means the drifting cloud.
Sheena planned to give Keitaro Izawa a stage name, but he refused and chose one for himself, Ichiyō Izawa.

Songwriting 
The band members have different writing styles. Sheena Ringo and Ichiyo Izawa write their songs using musical notation. Seiji Kameda uses different methods, recording himself humming, using musical instruments, or using a computer. Ukigumo, on the other hand, cannot write musical notation, Izawa or (less frequently) Sheena transcribe his tunes in the studio. Since Ukigumo writes music without considering a song, it is hard for Sheena to put the words to his music, so he often writes the lyrics to his own songs. Finally, Toshiki Hata stubbornly refused to write music, even declining to write lyrics when Sheena asked him to. He finally did contribute one song to the band's last EP before their split, Color Bars, and the first EP since their reunion, News.

Concerts and tours

Tours
Dynamite! (2005)
Domestic! Virgin Line (2006)
Domestic! Just Can't Help It (2006)
Spa & Treatment (2007)
Ultra C (2010)
Discovery (2011)
Domestique Bon Voyage (2012)
News Flash (2020)

Notable concerts and appearances
Sugoroku Ecstasy (2003)
Fuji Rock Festival (2004)
Sunset Live (2004)
Dai Ikkai Ringohan Taikai Adaruto Onrī (2005)
Society of the Citizens Vol. 1 (2006)
Countdown Japan 06/07 (2006)
Rising Sun Rock Festival (2008)
Society of the Citizens Vol. 2 (2008)
Countdown Japan 09/10 (2009)
EMI Rocks (2010 and 2012)
TV Asahi Dream Festival (2011)

Discography 

Kyōiku (2004)
Adult (2006)
Variety (2007)
Sports (2010)
Dai Hakken (2011)
Ongaku (2021)

Notes and references

External links 
 Official sites
 Tokyo Jihen's official site 
 Toshiba-EMI's Tokyo Jihen official artist page 

 
Japanese rock music groups
Japanese pop music groups
Musical groups from Tokyo
Musical groups established in 2004
Musical groups disestablished in 2012
Ringo Sheena
Seiji Kameda
EMI Music Japan artists
EMI Records artists
Virgin Records artists